Mirudhubashini Govindarajan (born 1947) is an Indian-born healthcare consultant, focussing on women's healthcare and infertility management in Coimbatore, Tamil Nadu, India.



Background 
Govindarajan was born in Coimbatore, Tamil Nadu, India. Her father was a lawyer, freedom fighter and politician focussing on organic farming. Govindarajan's mother was a doctor in Coimbatore.

Her early education was in Coimbatore, India and then she moved on to the alma mater of her mother, Stanley Medical College in Chennai to obtain her medical degree. On completion of her medical studies in Chennai, she moved to New York and then to Winnipeg, Manitoba, Canada. She later became a Fellow of Royal College of Surgeons of Canada in 1977 and a lecturer at the University of Manitoba, Canada.

On her return to India in 1981, Mirudhubashini joined Sri Ramakrishna Hospital and started their Obstetrics and Gynecology department. She was instrumental in the formation of Womens Center. In early 2011, she moved into a new facility of her own Womens Center, located in the Northern part of Coimbatore providing all women's healthcare services under a single roof. She holds a patent in relation to methods for the treatment of endometriosis and related disorders and conditions.

Current Positions 
Source:

 Clinical Director, Womens Center, Coimbatore
 Clinical Director, Assisted Reproductive Technology Center Coimbatore
 Director, Center for Perinatal Care Coimbatore Pvt Ltd
 Director, Womens Center and Hospitals Private Limited, Coimbatore
 Adjunct Professor, The Tamil Nadu Dr. MGR Medical University

Publications and research 
 Inheritance of Infertility
 Journal of Human Reproductive Medicine
 Fertilization and Development: Theory and Practice
 ART, PGD effective treatment for infertility

Memberships 
Source:
 Indian Medical Association
 Coimbatore Obstetrics and Gynecology Society - President, 2002-2003
 Federation Gynecological and Obstetrics Societies of India
 Indian Association of Cytologists
 Perinatal Committee-FOGSI
 European Society of Human Reproduction and Embryology
 American Society of Reproductive Medicine
 Member, Editorial Board international Journal of Obstetrics and Gynecology, published in New Zealand
 Founder President Coimbatore Ultrasound Society

Awards 
 Rotary for the Sake of Honor Award for the services in Women’s Health care
 Dinamalar award for Women "Achievement in Medical science"
 Distinguished alumni award for lifetime achievement from Mani High School 
 The Professor Arnold H. Einhorn's Endowment Orator in 2008

References 

1947 births
Living people
Fellows of the Royal College of Surgeons
Indian surgeons
Indian gynaecologists
Tamil scientists
Medical doctors from Tamil Nadu
People from Coimbatore
Indian women gynaecologists
20th-century Indian women scientists
20th-century Indian medical doctors
Indian women surgeons
Women scientists from Tamil Nadu
20th-century women physicians
20th-century surgeons